LMF may refer to:

 Lack of Moral Fibre, RAF World War II designation for air crew unwilling to fly 
 Lamb-Mössbauer factor, in solid-state spectroscopy
 Lazy Mutha Fucka, a Cantonese hip-hop band from Hong Kong
 Lexical Markup Framework, the ISO standard for lexicons
 Licentiate in Medicine and Surgery, a medical degree
 Linked Media Framework, predecessor of Apache Marmotta